Still Life: An Allegory of the Vanities of Human Life is an oil-on-panel painting by the Dutch Golden Age artist Harmen Steenwijck. Created around 1640, the work is highly allegorical and is painted in the Dutch vanitas style. It has been in the collection of the National Gallery in London since 1888.

History
Harmen Steenwijck's uncle, David Bailly, is often credited with inventing the artistic genre of vanitas, focusing on the transience of life. Bailly taught Steenwijck and his brother Pieter to paint in the Dutch city of Leiden. Steenwijck completed Still Life: An Allegory of the Vanities of Human Life around 1640; the painting is signed but undated, as was his practice.

In 1888, the painting was presented to the National Gallery in London by Lord Savile. Radiographic analysis of the work revealed that Steenwijck had originally included a bust of a man crowned with a wreath, which he painted over.

Description
Like most vanitas paintings, it contains deep religious overtones and was created to both remind viewers of their mortality (a memento mori) and to indicate the transient nature of material objects. The skull is the most obvious reminder of human mortality, which is also alluded to by delicate items such as the paper and the shell.

The painting includes a skull with missing teeth, almost falling off of the table. A frayed rope passes through the handles of a large pot. The face of the pot contains an image of a man's face. Several pieces are arranged so that they rest uncomfortably close to the edge of the table. An ornate Japanese sword, a sea shell, and a lute also feature in the image. The left side of the painting is essentially blank, with only a shaft of light cutting through the space. There is also a book, a watch and the front of a trumpet or horn.

Religion is a central allegorical theme in the painting. In the 2016 book Art and Music in the Early Modern Period, Katherine A. McIver wrote: "The image presents a "jumble of exquisite possessions ... abandoned hollow things ... receiving temporary luster from a higher source." The "higher source" is represented by a ray of sunlight that cuts directly to the right side of the skull in the painting.

In 2011 Elena Tuparevska of the University of Deusto wrote a paper entitled "Teaching the concepts of carpe diem and memento mori". In the paper she stated that the painting symbolizes knowledge; she also said, the sword and shell are rare and therefore they symbolize wealth. The lamp and watch symbolize the mortality of human life.

Reception
In 2001, the authors of Vermeer and the Delft School critiqued the painting by saying that the surface textures of the objects are contrasting and the light is harsh. In the 2014 the book titled, 1000 paintings of genius the authors have included this painting as number 354.

See also
 Catalogue of paintings in the National Gallery, London
 Still life paintings from the Netherlands, 1550–1720

References

External links
 
 National Gallery page for Still Life: An Allegory of the Vanities of Human Life

17th-century paintings
Still life paintings
Collections of the National Gallery, London
Allegorical paintings by Dutch artists
Books in art
Memento mori
Musical instruments in art
Paintings about death
Seashells in art
Skulls in art